The 2018 Torneo Descentralizado de Fútbol Profesional (known as the 2018 Copa Movistar for sponsorship reasons) was the 102nd edition of the top flight of Association football governed by the Federación Peruana de Futbol (FPF) ( or ). There were 16 teams in play; Alianza Lima were the defending champions. Sporting Cristal won their nineteenth domestic championship on 16 December after beating Alianza Lima in both legs of the finals.

Competition format
The season was played in four phases: Torneo de Verano (Summer Tournament), Torneo Apertura (Opening Tournament), Torneo Clausura (Closing Tournament), and the Playoffs.

In the Torneo de Verano, teams were separated into two groups. Teams in each group played two matches against each team in their group, once at home and once away. The winner of each group qualified to play a double-legged final. The group winner with the most points on the aggregate table chose their home match. The winner of this tournament gained access to the playoffs and the 2019 Copa Libertadores if they finished in the top eight of the aggregate table at the end of the season.

The Torneo Apertura and Torneo Clausura were two smaller tournament of 15 games in which each team played all others once. In the Torneo Clausura, matches were played in reverse order to the ones in the Torneo Apertura, and Apertura points did not carry over to Clausura. The winners of the Apertura and Clausura qualified to the playoffs and the 2019 Copa Libertadores as long as they finished in the top eight of the aggregate table at the end of the season.

In the Playoffs, the winners of the three tournaments and the top team in the aggregate table played two semifinals with the winners playing the final. If a team won two out of the three tournaments, they would qualify for the final and the winner of the remaining tournament would play in the semifinal the best team in the aggregate table. The team with the most points on the aggregate table chose the home match. If teams were tied in points, a third match on neutral ground would be played to decide the national champion. If a team won the three tournaments, the playoffs would have been canceled and they would be declared as champions. The 2019 Copa Sudamericana berths were awarded to the four teams with the best record in the aggregate table that did not qualify for the Copa Libertadores. The two teams with the fewest points at the end of the third leg were relegated.

Teams
There were 16 teams confirmed to play in the 2018 Torneo Descentralizado; 14 teams from the previous season, the 2017 Segunda División champion (Sport Boys), and the 2017 Copa Perú champion (Binacional).

Stadia and locations

a: Ayacucho played their home games in the Torneo de Verano and Torneo Apertura at Estadio Eloy Molina Robles in Huanta while their regular stadium Estadio Ciudad de Cumaná underwent maintenance works. However, they temporarily moved their home games to Estadio Huancayo in Huancayo since Estadio Eloy Molina Robles in Huanta was deemed unfit for use by the ADFP.
b: Binacional played their home games in the Torneo de Verano at Estadio Monumental Virgen de Chapi in Arequipa, moving to Estadio 25 de Noviembre in Moquegua for the start of the Torneo Apertura due to poor attendances in their home games.
c: Comerciantes Unidos played their home games at Estadio Carlos A. Olivares in Guadalupe due to their regular stadium Estadio Juan Maldonado Gamarra not meeting ADFP's stadium requirements. Comerciantes Unidos played their home games in the Torneo Clausura at Estadio Mansiche in Trujillo and Estadio Cristo El Señor in Baños del Inca after they were barred from using the Estadio Carlos A. Olivares for the remainder of the season due to the incidents in their home match against Ayacucho.
d: Deportivo Municipal played their home games at Estadio Nacional in Lima and Estadio Miguel Grau in Callao due to their regular stadium Estadio Iván Elías Moreno not meeting ADFP's stadium requirements.
e: UTC initially planned to play their home games at Estadio Mansiche in Trujillo due to their regular stadium Estadio Héroes de San Ramón not meeting ADFP's stadium requirements. However, and given that Estadio Mansiche was also unable to meet ADFP's stadium requirements, UTC decided to move their home games to Estadio Carlos A. Olivares in Guadalupe and later to Estadio Germán Contreras in Cajabamba.

Torneo de Verano

Group A

Group B

Finals
The champion was the team with the most points after the two legs were played. In case both teams tied in points and scored the same number of goals, there would have been 30 minutes of extra time and penalties if still tied.

Times are local, PET (UTC−5).

Sporting Cristal won 2–1 on aggregate and secured a spot in the Playoffs.

Torneo Apertura

Standings

Results

Torneo Clausura

Standings

Results

Aggregate table
All stages (Torneo de Verano, Torneo Apertura, and Torneo Clausura) of the 2018 season were aggregated into a single league table throughout the season to determine one of the teams that will qualify for the Copa Libertadores and the four Copa Sudamericana qualifiers, as well as those to be relegated at the end of the season.

Playoffs

Semi-final

First leg

Second leg

Tied 2–2 in points, Alianza Lima won on penalties and qualified for the Finals.

Finals
Sporting Cristal (Torneo de Verano and Torneo Apertura winners) and Alianza Lima (winning semi-finalists) contested the finals.

Sporting Cristal won 6–0 in points.

Top goalscorers

Source: ADFP

See also
 2018 Torneo de Promoción y Reserva
 2018 Peruvian Segunda División
 2018 Copa Perú

References

External links
  
Tournament regulations  
Torneo Descentralizado news at Peru.com 
Torneo Descentralizado statistics and news at Dechalaca.com 
Torneo Descentralizado statistics and news at The Peruvian Waltz 

2018
2018 in Peruvian football
2018 in South American football leagues